This is a list of speakers of the House of Assembly of Jamaica (1664-1865).

17th century  
 1664. Robert Freeman 
 1664. Sir Thomas Whetstone 
 1671. Samuel Long 
 1672-73. Major John Colebeck (pro tem.) 
 1673. Samuel Long 
 1677. Lieut.-Col. William Beeston 
 1679-88. Samuel Bernard 
 1688. George Nedham (pro tem.) 
 1688. Roger Hope Elletson 
 1688. Thomas Rives 
 1688. John Peeke 
 1691-92. Thomas Sutton 
 1693. Andrew Langley 
 1694. James Bradshaw 
 1698. Thomas Sutton

18th century
 1701, Andrew Langley 
 1702. Francis Rose 
 1702-03. Andrew Langley 
 1704. Edward Stanton 
 1705. Matthew Gregory 
 1706. Hugh Totterdale 
 1706. John Peeke 
 1706. Matthew Gregory
 1707-11. Peter Beckford (junior)
 1711. William Brodrick 
 1711. Samuel Vassall (pro tem.) 
 1711-13. Peter Beckford Jnr.
 1714. Hugh Totterdale 
 1715. John Blair 
 1716. Peter Beckford 
 1718. William Nedham 
 1719. Edmund Kelly 
 1721-22. George Modd 
 1722. William Nedham 
 1724. John Manley (pro tem.)  
 1725. Francis Melling 
 1727-28. Thomas Beckford 
 1731. John Stewart 
 1733. William Nedham 
 1745. Charles Price (afterwards Sir Charles, Bt.) (pro tem.) 
 1747. Richard Beckford (pro tem.)  
 1751. Richard Beckford (pro tem.)  
 1755. Edward Manning 
 1756. Thomas Hibbert 
 1756. Charles Price 
 1763. Charles Price, Jnr. (afterwards 2nd Baronet) 
 1764. Thomas Fearon (pro tem.)  
 1765. Charles Price, Jnr.
 1766. William Nedham 
 1768. Edward Long 
 1768. Phillip Pinnock 
 1770. Nicholas Bourke 
 1770. Charles Price, Jnr.
 1775. Phillip Pinnock 
 1776. Sir Charles Price (2nd Baronet) 
 1778. Jasper Hall 
 1778-93. Samuel Williams Haughton 
 1781. Thomas French (pro tem.) 
 1782. William Pusey (pro tem.) 
 1787. William Blake (pro tem.) 
 1793. William Blake 
 1797. Donald Campbell 
 1798. Keane Osborne

19th century
 1802. Philip Redwood 
 1809. James Lewis 
 1821. David Finlayson 
 1830. Richard Barrett 
 1832. Robert Allwood 
 1838. Richard Barrett 
 1839. Edward Panton 
 1842. Samuel Jackson Dallas 
 1849. Charles McLarty Morales 
 1861. Edward Jordon (pro tem.)
 1864. Charles Hamilton Jackson

References

 
Politics of Jamaica
speakers of the House of Assembly